Michael Mullen (1 February 1919 – 1 November 1982) was an Irish Labour Party politician and trade union official. 

He was born 1 February 1919 in Church Street, Dublin, the son of John Mullen, a glassblower, and Martha Smith. He was educated at St Michan's school in Halston St., but left school at 14 to work in a butcher's after his father's death. At 16 he got a job in the Ever Ready battery factory in Portobello, where he joined the Irish Transport and General Workers' Union (ITGWU), and was elected a shop steward the following year. He was a member of the Irish Republican Army during the 1940s, but left in 1945 to join the Labour Party.

He was an unsuccessful candidate at the 1951 and 1957 general elections. He was elected to Dáil Éireann as a Labour Party Teachta Dála (TD) for the Dublin North-West constituency at the 1961 general election and was re-elected at the 1965 general election. He did not contest the 1969 general election. He was nominated by the Taoiseach Liam Cosgrave in 1973 to the 13th Seanad.

He was a member of Dublin Corporation from 1960 to 1969. He was general secretary of the ITGWU from 1969 to 1982.

He was married to Anne Peavoy, and they had three daughters and two sons. He died on 1 November 1982 in Frankfurt, while attending a trade union conference.

References

1919 births
1982 deaths
Irish trade unionists
Labour Party (Ireland) TDs
Members of the 17th Dáil
Members of the 18th Dáil
Members of the 13th Seanad
Politicians from County Dublin
Labour Party (Ireland) senators